Webster Township is one of the nineteen townships of Wood County, Ohio, United States.  The 2010 census found 1,283 people in the township.

Geography
Located in the eastern central part of the county, it borders the following townships:
Perrysburg Township - north
Troy Township - northeast
Freedom Township - southeast
Center Township - southwest
Middleton Township - west

No municipalities are located in Webster Township.

Name and history
Webster Township was established in 1846. It is the only Webster Township statewide.

Government
The township is governed by a three-member board of trustees, who are elected in November of odd-numbered years to a four-year term beginning on the following January 1. Two are elected in the year after the presidential election and one is elected in the year before it. There is also an elected township fiscal officer, who serves a four-year term beginning on April 1 of the year after the election, which is held in November of the year before the presidential election. Vacancies in the fiscal officership or on the board of trustees are filled by the remaining trustees.

References

External links
County website

Townships in Wood County, Ohio
Townships in Ohio